Jessie M. Honeyman Memorial State Park, also known simply as Honeyman State Park, is in Lane County of the U.S. state of Oregon. The  Oregon Dunes National Recreation Area adjoins the park to the west. Many amenities are available, including over 200 campsites, all-terrain vehicle access, swimming, fishing and sandboarding.

Originally named Camp Woahink, the park was built by the Civilian Conservation Corps (CCC), and was later renamed in honor Jessie M. Honeyman (1852–1948) of Portland. As president of the Oregon Roadside Council, Honeyman worked with Samuel Boardman, Oregon's first Superintendent of State Parks in the 1920s and 1930s, to preserve Oregon coastal lands.

Several of the structures built by the CCC, including the camp store, three picnic shelters, and the administrative building, comprise the Jessie M. Honeyman Memorial State Park Historic District. The campground was added in the 1950s. The Lake Woahink Seaplane Base is on Woahink Lake, southeast of the park, and Camp Cleawox, a Girl Scout camp, is across Cleawox Lake and northwest of the park.

Climate
Honeyman State Park has a warm-summer Mediterranean climate (Köppen Csb).

Gallery

See also
 List of Oregon state parks

References

External links
 

Parks in Lane County, Oregon
Oregon Coast
State parks of Oregon
Civilian Conservation Corps in Oregon
National Register of Historic Places in Lane County, Oregon